The 2021 Youth World Weightlifting Championships was held from 5 to 12 October in Jeddah, Saudi Arabia.

Medal overview

Men

Women

Medals tables 
Ranking by Big (Total result) medals
 

Ranking by all medals: Big (Total result) and Small (Snatch and Clean & Jerk)

Team ranking

Men

Women

Participating nations 
221 weightlifters from 50 countries were registered to compete:

References

External links
 2021 IWF Youth World Championships: Results
 2021 IWF Youth World Championships: Results Book

IWF Youth World Weightlifting Championships
International sports competitions hosted by Saudi Arabia
Youth World
Youth World Weightlifting Championships
Weightlifting in Saudi Arabia